Tony Williams is a retired American soccer player who spent his entire career with the Richmond Kickers.

In 1994, Williams graduated from St. John Vianney High School.  He attended Clemson University, playing on the men's soccer team from 1994 to 1997.  In February 1998, the Hampton Roads Mariners selected Williams in the second round (twentieth overall) of the A-League draft.  They traded his rights to the Richmond Kickers where he played from 1998 to 2007.  In 2006, the Kickers won the USL Second Division championship.

External links
 Richmond Kickers: Tony WIlliams

References

Living people
1976 births
American soccer players
Clemson Tigers men's soccer players
Richmond Kickers players
USL First Division players
USL Second Division players
A-League (1995–2004) players
Soccer players from St. Louis
Association football defenders
Association football midfielders